The 2008 Issers bombing occurred on August 19, 2008, when a suicide bomber drove and detonated a vehicle laden with explosives into a crowd of para-military recruits waiting to take exams outside a police academy in Issers, Boumerdès Province, Algeria killing 43 and injuring 38. The Al-Qaeda Organization in the Islamic Maghreb is suspected as being responsible.

International reactions

International organizations
 - The French EU presidency condemned the bombing, releasing a statement in which the EU "very firmly condemns the terrorist acts that have just claimed so many lives", remarking that Algerian people are "once again victims of blind and barbaric terrorist violence".

Countries
 – Algerian Interior Minister Yazid Zerhouni called the bombing "an act against Algerians, these terrorist gangs are seeking through attacks against civilians to loosen the net closing around them as the security forces drive them to the wall".
 - The French Prime Minister, François Fillon, phoned his Algerian counterpart to assure him "the support of France in the fight against terrorism".
 - The Italian Prime Minister Silvio Berlusconi expressed his support for Algeria's leadership.
 - Andrei Nesterenko, spokesman of the Russian Foreign Ministry expressed in a statement "We express our sincere condolences to the relatives and friends of those killed and wounded, and resolutely condemn the latest bloody terrorist atrocities", adding "We confirm our solidarity with friendly Algeria and our support for the actions of the authorities in the eradication of terrorism.".
 - Mohamed Abdelaziz, president of the SADR, vividly condemned "the coward terrorist attacks in Issers and Bouira (Algeria), which caused the loss of innocent lives", recalling the Sahrawi government and people "unconditional solidarity with Algeria in these sad moments".
 - The Spanish Foreign Minister, Miguel Ángel Moratinos, called his Algerian counterpart to express his condolences and the support of the Spanish people. "The government expresses its indignation and its firm condemnation of the cowardly terrorist attack on Wednesday against the civilian population of Bouira, which left many dead and wounded, just one day after the attack in Issers," the ministry said in a statement.

See also
 Terrorist bombings in Algeria
 List of terrorist incidents, 2008

References

External links 
Bombing kills dozens in Algeria

Boumerdès Province
Suicide car and truck bombings in Algeria
Mass murder in 2008
Terrorist incidents in Algeria
Terrorist incidents in Algeria in 2008
2008 murders in Algeria
Islamic terrorism in Algeria